William Edward Cleator Sr. (May 25, 1927 – February 10, 1993) was an American politician from San Diego, California. He served on the City Council for six years including five months as acting mayor. He was a Republican, although city positions are officially nonpartisan per California state law.

Life and career
Cleator was born in San Diego and served in the Navy. He was a successful industrialist, retiring as CEO of Tool Research Inc. in 1977.  He then started Cleator Furniture, a custom office furniture manufacturing business in San Diego, with his nephew, Robert K. Cleator Jr.

In 1979 Cleator was elected to the San Diego City Council representing district 2. He served for six years, from 1979 to 1986. He was known as a rather outspoken populist. When Mayor Pete Wilson was elected to the U.S. Senate, Cleator served as acting  Mayor of San Diego from January to May 1983. While serving as acting mayor he hosted a February 1983 visit by Britain's Queen Elizabeth II, during which he was heavily criticized for a faux pas. Trying to be helpful on a harbor tour, he lightly touched the queen's back and said "This way, your Majesty," but touching the Queen is against royal protocol.

He ran for mayor in 1983 in the special election to replace Wilson, but was defeated. He ran again for mayor in 1986 and was defeated in the primary election. He decided not to run for a third term on the city council.

Cleator helped start the San Diego Cruise Industry Consortium in the 1980s, which attracted cruise ships to call at a new downtown cruise ship terminal.

He died of cancer in 1993 at his home in the Point Loma neighborhood of San Diego. He is buried with his wife, Marilyn, at Fort Rosecrans National Cemetery. Bill Cleator Community Park in Point Loma is named for him.

See also
 Oral history interview, San Diego Historical Society

References

1927 births
1993 deaths
Mayors of San Diego
Burials at Fort Rosecrans National Cemetery
San Diego City Council members
California Republicans
Deaths from cancer in California
20th-century American politicians